130th meridian can refer to:

130th meridian east, a line of longitude east of the Greenwich Meridian
130th meridian west, a line of longitude west of the Greenwich Meridian